Zhuxi County is a county in the northwest of Hubei province, People's Republic of China, bordering Shaanxi to the west and Chongqing to the southwest. It is under the administration of the prefecture-level city of Shiyan.

Toponymy 
The name Zhuxi County is named for the Zhuxi River, whose name was derived from the large amounts of bamboo forests which bordered both sides of the river.

History 
The area of present-day Zhuxi County once belong to the Chu State.

Zhuxi County was established in 1476 under the reign of the Chenghua Emperor.

In 1932, the Republic of China introduced , and the county was assigned to the 11th Administrative Inspectorate of Hubei Province. In 1936, it was re-assigned to the 8th Administrative Inspectorate of Hubei Province.

In 1994, Zhuxi County was placed under the prefecture-level city of Shiyan, where it remains today.

In 2010,  was upgraded from a township to a town.

Geography 
The county's main rivers are the Zhuxi River and the Huiwan River, which both flow into the larger Han River.

Climate 

Administrative divisions

Zhuxi County is divided into eleven towns, four townships, and eight other township-level divisions.

Its other township level divisions are Longwaya Tea Farm, Guoying Zhuxi Comprehensive Farm, Stock Seed Farm, Fishing Stock Farm, Zhongxu Field, Wangjiashan Tea Farm, Biaohu Tree Farm, and Shuangzhu Tree Farm.

Economy 
Zhuxi County has sizable deposits of coal, limestone, and marble. The county is also home to the most Taxus chinensis production of a county in China.

References

Counties of Hubei
Shiyan